Deuel County is a county in the U.S. state of South Dakota. As of the 2020 census, the population was 4,295. Its county seat is Clear Lake. The county was created in 1862, and was organized in 1878. It is named for Jacob Deuel, a legislator in 1862.

Geography

Deuel County lies on the east boundary line of South Dakota. Its east boundary line abuts the west boundary line of the state of Minnesota. Its terrain consists of rolling hills, sloped to the northeast. The area is largely devoted to agriculture. The county's highest elevation occurs on its upper west boundary line, at 1,936' (590m) ASL.

Major highways

  Interstate 29
  U.S. Highway 212
  South Dakota Highway 15
  South Dakota Highway 22
  South Dakota Highway 28
  South Dakota Highway 101

Adjacent Counties

 Grant County - north
 Lac Qui Parle County, Minnesota - northeast
 Yellow Medicine County, Minnesota - east
 Lincoln County, Minnesota - southeast
 Brookings County - south
 Hamlin County - southwest
 Codington County - northwest

Lakes

 Bullhead Lake
 Clear Lake
 East Coteau Lake
 Fish Lake
 Lake Alice
 Lake Cochrane
 Lake Francis
 Lake Oliver
 Lone Tree Lake
 North Coteau Lake
 Round Lake
 Rush Lake
 Salt Lake (part)
 School Lake
 South Coteau Lake
 Wigdale Lake

Protected areas

 Altamont State Public Shooting Area
 Astoria State Wildlife Management Area
 Briggs Lake State Public Shooting Area
 Crystal Springs State Public Shooting Area
 Lake Cochrane State Recreation Area
 Lake Francis State Public Shooting Area
 Lone Tree Lake State Public Shooting Area
 Mitchell State Public Shooting Area
 Mud Lake State Public Shooting Area
 Nelson State Wildlife Management Area
 Rome State Wildlife Management Area
 Round Lake State Wildlife Management Area
 Runge State Wildlife Management Area
 Rush Lake State Public Shooting Area
 Sharp State Public Shooting Area
 Singsaas Slough State Wildlife Management Area
 Sokota State Wildlife Management Area (partial)

Demographics

2000 census
As of the 2000 United States Census, there were 4,498 people, 1,843 households, and 1,258 families in the county. The population density was 7 people per square mile (3/km2). There were 2,172 housing units at an average density of 4 per square mile (1/km2). The racial makeup of the county was 98.51% White, 0.09% Black or African American, 0.29% Native American, 0.18% Asian, 0.02% Pacific Islander, 0.24% from other races, and 0.67% from two or more races. 0.76% of the population were Hispanic or Latino of any race. 46.9% were of German and 29.1% Norwegian ancestry.

There were 1,843 households, out of which 29.20% had children under the age of 18 living with them, 60.40% were married couples living together, 4.90% had a female householder with no husband present, and 31.70% were non-families. 28.60% of all households were made up of individuals, and 14.40% had someone living alone who was 65 years of age or older. The average household size was 2.40 and the average family size was 2.97.

The county population contained 25.30% under the age of 18, 5.90% from 18 to 24, 25.40% from 25 to 44, 22.60% from 45 to 64, and 20.70% who were 65 years of age or older. The median age was 41 years. For every 100 females there were 99.60 males. For every 100 females age 18 and over, there were 99.60 males.

The median income for a household in the county was $31,788, and the median income for a family was $39,511. Males had a median income of $26,306 versus $19,282 for females. The per capita income for the county was $15,977. About 6.90% of families and 10.30% of the population were below the poverty line, including 9.80% of those under age 18 and 16.70% of those age 65 or over.

2010 census
As of the 2010 United States Census, there were 4,364 people, 1,819 households, and 1,228 families in the county. The racial makeup of the county was 97.5% white, 0.3% American Indian, 0.3% black or African American, 0.1% Asian, 1.0% from other races, and 0.9% from two or more races. Those of Hispanic or Latino origin made up 2.0% of the population. In terms of ancestry, 50.4% were German, 25.4% were Norwegian, 8.0% were Irish, 6.6% were Dutch, 5.5% were English, and 2.9% were American.

Of the 1,819 households, 28.2% had children under the age of 18 living with them, 58.6% were married couples living together, 5.0% had a female householder with no husband present, 32.5% were non-families, and 29.1% of all households were made up of individuals. The average household size was 2.37 and the average family size was 2.92. The median age was 43.9 years.

The median income for a household in the county was $47,000 and the median income for a family was $55,439. Males had a median income of $35,197 versus $26,020 for females. The per capita income for the county was $22,276. About 3.0% of families and 6.1% of the population were below the poverty line, including 5.6% of those under age 18 and 11.9% of those age 65 or over.

Communities

Cities
 Clear Lake (county seat)
 Gary

Towns

 Altamont
 Astoria
 Brandt
 Goodwin
 Toronto

Unincorporated communities
 Bemis
 Moritz
 Tunerville

Townships

Altamont
Antelope Valley
Blom, Brandt
Clear Lake
Glenwood
Goodwin
Grange
Havana
Herrick
Hidewood
Lowe
Norden
Portland
Rome
Scandinavia

Politics
Deuel County is a typical eastern South Dakota county in its political history, which is somewhat akin to the Midwestern states of Iowa and Minnesota. It was strongly Republican in its early years, with no Democrat except William Jennings Bryan gaining forty percent up to 1928. Franklin D. Roosevelt in 1932 became the first Democrat to carry the county, but lost it to Alf Landon in 1936, whilst – like most of the Midwest – the county showed a powerful anti-Roosevelt trend in 1940 and 1944 due to opposition to World War II. From 1964, the county showed a strong trend towards the Democratic Party – so much so that it was one of only 130 counties nationwide to support South Dakota native George McGovern in 1972 against Richard Nixon, and one of only five nationwide to have supported both landslide losers Landon and McGovern.

Between 1976 and 2010, Deuel was a competitive swing county, voting for the winning candidate in every election until 2008 when Barack Obama lost by 34 votes. Over the past two elections, however, Deuel – in common with many rural counties nationwide – has shown an abrupt swing towards the Republican Party. Donald Trump’s 2016 win was the largest since Dwight D. Eisenhower in 1952.

See also
 National Register of Historic Places listings in Deuel County, South Dakota

Notes

References

 
1878 establishments in Dakota Territory
Populated places established in 1878